Scotty McGee (born December 4, 1986) is a former American football cornerback. He was drafted by the Jacksonville Jaguars in the sixth round of the 2010 NFL Draft. He played cornerback for James Madison University.

Professional career

Jacksonville Jaguars
He was drafted by the Jacksonville Jaguars with the 203rd overall pick in the sixth round of the 2010 NFL Draft.

McGee was waived on September 2, 2011.

External links
 James Madison Dukes Bio
 Jacksonville Jaguars Bio

1986 births
Living people
American football cornerbacks
Jacksonville Jaguars players
James Madison Dukes football players
Players of American football from Virginia
Sportspeople from Virginia Beach, Virginia